Lee Howard (born 6 February 1967) is an English former professional footballer who played in the Football League for Mansfield Town.

References

1967 births
Living people
English footballers
Association football forwards
English Football League players
Mansfield Town F.C. players
Harworth Colliery F.C. players
Eastwood Town F.C. players
Worksop Town F.C. players